Robert Gould or Bob Gould may refer to:

Bob Gould 
Bob Gould (activist) (1937–2011), Australian activist and bookseller
Bob Gould (rugby union) (1863–1931), Welsh rugby union player
Bobby Gould (born 1946), English footballer and manager
Bobby Gould (ice hockey) (born 1957), Canadian ice hockey player

Robert Gould 
Robert Gould (c. 1660–1708/9), English poet
Robert Gould (art director), American art director
Robert E. Gould (1924–1998), American psychiatrist
Robbie Gould (Robert Paul Gould, born 1981), American football player
Robert S. Gould (1826–1904), Chief Justice of the Texas Supreme Court

See also
Bobbie Goulding (born 1972), English rugby league footballer and coach
Bobbie Goulding Jr. (born 1993), his son, English rugby league footballer
Bobby Gould in Hell, a 1989 play by David Mamet
Robert Goulet (1933–2007), entertainer